The Alabama–Coushatta Tribe of Texas (Alabama: Albaamaha-Kosaatihaha, Coushatta: Albaamoha-Kowassaatiha) is a federally recognized tribe of Alabama and Koasati in Polk County, Texas. These peoples are descended from members of the historic Muscogee or Creek Confederacy of numerous tribes in the Southeastern U.S., particularly Georgia and Alabama.

They are one of three federally recognized tribes in Texas. As of 2022, the tribe has over 1,200 members with 589 residing on the Texas reservation.

History
They are one of eight federally recognized tribes whose members are descended from the Muscogee Confederacy of the Southeast. Four tribes are located in Oklahoma, to where most of the Muscogee were forcibly removed from the Indigenous Muscogee homeland in Alabama and western Georgia in the 1830s during the Trail of Tears under Indian Removal, one tribe is in Louisiana, where another band of Muscogee fled European encroachment in two waves in the late 18th century and the early 19th century, and another tribe comprises the Poarch Band of Creeks, who remained in Alabama. The Seminole Indian Nation in Florida also includes a large percentage of descendants of the Creek Confederacy who relocated there and merged with another tribe.

Under pressure from European American settlement, the ancestors of this tribe were Alabama and Coushatta peoples who migrated from Alabama and the Southeast into Louisiana and finally East Texas when it was under Spanish rule in the late 18th century. They settled in an area known as Big Thicket and adapted their culture to the environment of forest and waters.

When the area began to be settled by European Americans from the United States, the tribes established friendly relations and traded with the new settlers. Sam Houston helped protect them during years of conflicts with other Native Americans in the area. After the annexation of Texas by the United States, settlement increased and the tribes were under pressure again. They appealed to the state to have land set aside for their exclusive use.

Termination efforts
As part of the Indian termination policy followed by the US government between the 1940s and 1960s, the Alabama Coushatta Tribe was targeted. On 23 August 1954, the United States Congress passed laws to terminate the federal relationship with the tribe. Public Law ch. 831, §1, 68 Stat. 768 provided that the Secretary of the Interior was to transfer to the State of Texas the tribal lands for the benefit of the tribe. In addition, it terminated the federal trust relationship to the tribe and the individual members of the tribe and cancelled any federal debts. In 1965 under House Bill 1096, 59th Texas Legislature, Regular Session, the newly formed Texas Indian Commission took over state administration and supervision for the Alabama-Coushatta Indian Reservation.

On 22 March 1983, Texas Attorney General Jim Mattox released an opinion (JM-17) stating that the state's assumption of power over the property of the Alabama–Coushatta was a violation of the Texas Constitution. He stated that as the federal government's withdrawal of its recognition, the tribe was "merely an unincorporated association under Texas law, with the same legal status as other private associations ... the 3,071-acre tract is entirely free from any legally meaningful designation as an 'Indian Reservation'." In response to concerns by the tribe, Representative Ronald D. Coleman of Texas introduced a federal bill on 28 February 1985 to restore federal jurisdiction for the tribe. Because the initial bill HR 1344 allowed gambling, amendments were made and the Yselta del Sur Pueblo and Alabama and Coushatta Indian Tribes of Texas Restoration Act was reintroduced as HR 318. Public Law 100–89, 101 STAT. 666 was enacted 18 August 1987 and restored the federal relationship with the tribe. Section 207 (25 U.S.C. § 737)  specifically prohibits all gaming activities prohibited by the laws of the state of Texas.

Both the Alabama and Koasati languages are Muskogean languages.

Reservation
The Alabama–Coushatta Reservation was established in 1854, when the state bought "1,110.7 acres of land for the Alabama Indian reservation. About 500 tribe members settled on this land during the winter of 1854–55. In 1855, the Texas legislature appropriated funds to purchase 640 acres for the Coushattas" but never followed through. The Coushatta began to live with the Alabama on their reservation.

They acquired more land, so today their reservation is 4,593.7 acres large, located 17 miles east of Livingston, Texas in the Big Thicket area.

Demographics

As of the 2020, the reservation comprises a total population of 679 individuals. Of those individuals, 86.7% (589) are American Indian, 8.2% (56) are Hispanic or Latino, 6.4% (44) identify as two or more races, 5.5% (38) are White, 0.88% identify as some other race, and 0.14% (1) are African American or Black. The reservation has a young population, with 42.3% under the age of 18 in contrast to 4.5% over the age of 65.

Economically, 65.9% of the population is employed. The average household earning is $49,219, which is over $10,000 less than the national average, and 17.2% live in poverty, 8.6% higher than the national average. Additionally, 11.4% of the population has a bachelor's degree or higher, 36.5% of the total population having only a high school degree or equivalent. Of the total population, 38.5% does not have at-home internet, which is 11.5% higher than the national average of 14.5%.

The homeownership rate on the reservation is 9.4% higher than the national average at 74.9%.

Environment

The tribe has its own wildland fire department and land management program that uses fire suppression tactics to manage the woodlands on their tribal land. This is particularly important for the longleaf pine trees that have been used by the tribe and their ancestors for basketry and home building for centuries. According to The Nature Conservancy, 95% of longleaf pine forests have been lost in the region. Longleaf pines are dependent on fire to seed and grow. The Nature Conservancy funded the tribe to buy equipment and participate in training for wildland management. As a result, they manage the over 200 acres of pine trees they planted in 2012 and the additional 200 acres of older growth trees.

Government

The Alabama–Coushatta Tribe of Texas is headquartered in Livingston, Texas. They operate as a tribal council, with a Principal Chief and Chief serving as advisors to an elected tribal council comprising a Chair, Vice chair, and five additional members. The tribe's constitution and by-laws were adopted on June 16, 1971.

As of 2022, the tribal chiefs and council members are as follows:

Principal Chief: Unfilled
Chief: Donnis B. Battise (Mikko Istimatokla)
Council member: Rick Sylestine, Chair
Council member: Nita Battise, Vice-chair
Council member: Yolanda Poncho, Secretary
Council member: Ronnie Thomas, Treasurer
Council member: Roland Poncho, member
Council member: David Battise, member
Council member: Melanie Battise, member

The most recent Principal Chief, Herbert G. Johnson, Sr. (Mikko Choba), died in 2021. The seat is reported as unfilled as of July 2022.

Economy

Both the peoples struggled after the Civil War, as few spoke English and they had difficulty finding jobs. Today, the tribe operates two primary economic enterprises: Naskila Casino, a casino, and A.C.T. Holdings, an investment and economic development LLC. The tribe also has a 26-acre campground open to the public located on Lake Tombigbee. The reservation also includes a truck stop, smoke shop, and a souvenir shop.

Naskila Casino

The casino comprises over 790 bingo games in an over 30,000 square foot facility. The tribe has engaged with two lawsuits against the State of Texas regarding the casino. In 2001, the tribe filed a complaint against the state for officials obstructing the tribe's legal right to operate a casino on tribal land. That resulted in a ruling in favor of the state, prohibiting the tribe from operating their casino. In 2016, Texas filed a complaint against the tribe to stop the tribe from operating a bingo hall. The judge ruled in favor of the tribe because bingo is not prohibited in the state of Texas. In December 2021, the tribe joined Ysleta del Sur Pueblo to file an amicus brief with the United States Supreme Court to ensure their rights to operate bingo halls on their reservations. The Supreme Court agreed to review the case on their docket in October 2022.

Culture

In 1994, ground was broken for the now open Alabama-Coushatta Cultural Center. In April 2022, the tribe broke ground on the 49,000 square foot Aati Imaabachi Imiisa Education Center to house the education department, library, a gym, play areas, and youth education programs.

The reservation has two churches, a Christian First Assembly of God church and a First Indian Presbyterian church.

Each June, the reservation hosts a powwow.

References

Further reading
Wray, Dianna. "The Alabama–Coushatta Still Exist and Are Doing What They Need to Do to Continue", Houston Press. 13 November 2013.
Wray, Dianna. "Cover Story: Dreamcatchers", Houston Press, 13 November 2013.

External links

 
 "Native American Heritage Month Collection Spotlight: James Ludwell Davis Sylestine and the Alabama-Coushatta Tribe of Texas" from the Texas State Library and Archives

Koasati
Federally recognized tribes in the United States
Native American tribes in Texas
American Indian reservations in Texas
Polk County, Texas